Lythrum californicum is a species of flowering plant in the loosestrife family known by the common name California loosestrife. It is native to northern Mexico and the southwestern United States into the Midwest as far east as Oklahoma and Texas. It often grows in moist habitat. The waxy linear to lance-shaped leaves are arranged oppositely lower on the plant, and alternately toward the top. The inflorescence is a terminal spike of flowers with purple petals under a centimeter long. Flowers are heterostylous on one individual plant, with some having long, protruding styles and some with shorter styles not protruding from the mouth of the flower. The fruit is an oval capsule containing many minute seeds.

This plant resembles its relative, the notorious noxious weed purple loosestrife, but California loosestrife is usually not weedy.

References

External links

Jepson Manual Treatment
Photo gallery

californicum
Plants described in 1840
Flora of Arizona
Flora of California
Flora of Chihuahua (state)
Flora of Northeastern Mexico
Flora of Nevada
Flora of Texas